This page lists all described species of the spider family Pacullidae accepted by the World Spider Catalog :

† Furcembolus

† Furcembolus Wunderlich, 2008
 † F. andersoni Wunderlich, 2008 
 † F. armatura Wunderlich, 2015 
 † F. biacuta Wunderlich, 2015 
 † F. crassitibia Wunderlich, 2017 
 † F. dissolata Wunderlich, 2015 
 † F. equester Wunderlich, 2015 
 † F. grossa Wunderlich, 2017 
 † F. longior Wunderlich, 2017 
 † F. tuberosa Wunderlich, 2015

Lamania

Lamania Lehtinen, 1981
 L. bernhardi (Deeleman-Reinhold, 1980) — Borneo
 L. bokor Schwendinger & Košulič, 2015 — Cambodia
 L. gracilis Schwendinger, 1989 — Bali
 L. inornata (Deeleman-Reinhold, 1980) — Borneo
 L. kraui (Shear, 1978) — Thailand, Malaysia
 L. lipsae Dierkens, 2011 — Borneo
 L. nirmala Lehtinen, 1981 (type) — Borneo
 L. sheari (Brignoli, 1980) — Indonesia (Sulawesi)

Paculla

Paculla Simon, 1887
 P. bukittimahensis Lin & Li, 2017 — Singapore
 P. cameronensis Shear, 1978 — Malaysia
 P. globosa Lin & Li, 2017 — Singapore
 P. granulosa (Thorell, 1881) (type) — New Guinea
 P. mului Bourne, 1981 — Borneo
 P. negara Shear, 1978 — Malaysia
 P. sulaimani Lehtinen, 1981 — Malaysia
 P. wanlessi Bourne, 1981 — Borneo

Perania

Perania Thorell, 1890
 P. annam Schwendinger & Košulič, 2015 — Vietnam
 P. armata (Thorell, 1890) — Indonesia (Sumatra)
 P. birmanica (Thorell, 1898) — Myanmar
 P. cerastes Schwendinger, 1994 — Malaysia
 P. coryne Schwendinger, 1994 — Malaysia
 P. deelemanae Schwendinger, 2013 — Indonesia (Sumatra)
 P. egregia Schwendinger, 2013 — Thailand
 P. ferox Schwendinger, 2013 — Thailand
 P. harau Schwendinger, 2013 — Indonesia (Sumatra)
 P. korinchica Hogg, 1919 — Indonesia (Sumatra)
 P. nasicornis Schwendinger, 1994 — Thailand
 P. nasuta Schwendinger, 1989 — Thailand
 P. nigra (Thorell, 1890) (type) — Indonesia (Sumatra)
 P. picea (Thorell, 1890) — Indonesia (Sumatra)
 P. quadrifurcata Schwendinger, 2013 — Thailand
 P. robusta Schwendinger, 1989 — China, Thailand
 P. selatan Schwendinger, 2013 — Indonesia (Sumatra)
 P. siamensis Schwendinger, 1994 — Thailand
 P. tumida Schwendinger, 2013 — Thailand
 P. utara Schwendinger, 2013 — Indonesia (Sumatra)

Sabahya

Sabahya Deeleman-Reinhold, 1980
 S. bispinosa Deeleman-Reinhold, 1980 — Borneo
 S. kinabaluana Deeleman-Reinhold, 1980 (type) — Borneo

References

Pacullidae